Canadian County is a county located in the U.S. state of Oklahoma.  As of the 2020 census, the population was 154,405, making it the fifth most populous county in Oklahoma. Its county seat is El Reno.

The county is named for the Canadian River, which forms part of its southern border. The river may have been named for early European explorers who were fur traders and trappers from New France, or pre-1763 colonial Canada.

Canadian County is part of the Oklahoma City Metropolitan Statistical Area.

History
In 1859, the United States expelled the Caddo Nation of Louisiana from its Brazos reservation in Texas and relocated it to what would eventually become Canadian County, Oklahoma. Showetat, the last hereditary chief of the Caddo, set up his camp here and is considered Canadian County's first permanent resident. (Union City developed near his camp site.)

The federal government relocated the Wichita tribe to this same part of Indian Territory in 1861. By the Treaty of Medicine Lodge, the United States assigned the land west of the Caddo and Wichita to the Cheyenne and Arapaho tribes. They were relocated from Colorado in 1869. The Cheyenne-Arapaho Agency (later renamed the Darlington Agency) was established in 1870.

Canadian County was formed in 1889 as County Four of Oklahoma Territory as part of the Oklahoma Organic Act, which created Oklahoma Territory from part of Indian Territory. It was named after the Canadian River, which runs through the county.

This county was settled by European-Americans after the April 22, 1889, land run, which gave away expropriated Native American land.  It was expanded by a second land run in 1892. In 1902, after distribution of communal lands among households of the Cheyenne and Arapaho, their 'surplus' lands were opened to European-American settlement. El Reno was chosen as the county seat over competitors Reno City, Frisco, and Canadian City.

The county was the location of the last great battle of the Cheyenne and Arapaho against United States Army forces.

Geography
The county lies mostly within the Red Bed Plains, a subregion of the Osage Plains physiographic region. Its northwestern corner is in the Gypsum Hills. The county is drained by the North Canadian River and the Canadian River, which both flow through the county from northwest to southeast.

According to a study published by the Oklahoma Geological Survey, the North Canadian River drains about 40 percent of the county, the Canadian River drains about 32 percent, and the Cimarron River drains about 27 percent (mostly in the northeastern part of the county). About 1 percent of the county is drained by Sugar Creek, which empties into the Washita River, itself a tributary of the Red River.

Its named tributaries are Sixmile Creek, Fourmile Creek, Purcell Creek, Shell Creek, and Mustang Creek.

Named tributaries include Dry Creek and Boggy Creek.

The Cimarron River does not flow through the county, but drains part of the northeastern area via its tributaries: Kingfisher, Dead Indian, Uncle John, Cottonwood, Soldier, and Deer creeks.

Adjacent counties
 Kingfisher County (north)
 Logan County (northeast)
 Oklahoma County (east)
 Cleveland County (southeast)
 Grady County (south)
 Caddo County (southwest)
 Blaine County (northwest)

Demographics

As of the census of 2000, there were 87,697 people, 31,484 households, and 24,431 families residing in the county.  The population density was 98 people per square mile (38/km2).  There were 33,969 housing units at an average density of 38 per square mile (15/km2).  The racial makeup of the county was 87.01% White, 2.16% Black or African American, 4.27% Native American, 2.45% Asian, 0.05% Pacific Islander, 1.35% from other races, and 2.72% from two or more races.  3.86% of the population were Hispanic or Latino of any race.

There were 31,484 households, out of which 39.80% had children under the age of 18 living with them, 64.30% were married couples living together, 9.70% had a female householder with no husband present, and 22.40% were non-families. 19.20% of all households were made up of individuals, and 7.10% had someone living alone who was 65 years of age or older.  The average household size was 2.71 and the average family size was 3.10.

In the county, the population was spread out, with 28.00% under the age of 18, 8.20% from 18 to 24, 30.70% from 25 to 44, 23.50% from 45 to 64, and 9.50% who were 65 years of age or older.  The median age was 35 years. For every 100 females, there were 99.40 males.  For every 100 females age 18 and over, there were 97.70 males.

The median income for a household in the county was $45,439, and the median income for a family was $51,180. Males had a median income of $35,944 versus $24,631 for females. The per capita income for the county was $19,691.  About 5.80% of families and 7.90% of the population were below the poverty line, including 9.70% of those under age 18 and 7.20% of those age 65 or over.

Politics

Government and infrastructure
The Federal Bureau of Prisons operates the Federal Correctional Institution, El Reno in El Reno, Canadian County.

Economy
Agriculture has been a mainstay of the economy since the beginning of non-Indigenous settlement in the late 1800s.

Transportation

Major highways

Airports
 Clarence E. Page Municipal Airport is a public use airport located in Canadian County, 15 nautical miles (28 km) west of the central business district of Oklahoma City, which also owns this airport.
 Sundance Airpark is a public use airport located in Canadian County, 11 nautical miles (20 km) northwest of the central business district of Oklahoma City. This airport is privately owned.
 El Reno Regional Airport,  El Reno, OK

Communities

Cities
 El Reno (county seat)
 Geary (partly in Blaine County)
 Mustang
 Oklahoma City (mostly in Oklahoma County)
 Piedmont (partly in Kingfisher County)
 Yukon

Towns
 Calumet
 Okarche (partly in Kingfisher County)
 Union City

Census-designated place
 Cedar Lake

Other unincorporated communities
 Concho
 Four Counties Corner (formerly Lockridge)
 Scott (partly in Caddo County)

Education
School districts include:

K-12:

 Calumet Public Schools
 Cashion Public Schools
 Deer Creek Public Schools
 El Reno Public Schools
 Geary Public Schools
 Hinton Public Schools
 Lookeba-Sickles Public Schools
 Minco Public Schools
 Mustang Public Schools
 Okarche Public Schools
 Piedmont Public Schools
 Union City Public Schools
 Yukon Public Schools

Elementary:
 Banner Public School
 Darlington Public School
 Maple Public School
 Riverside Public School

NRHP sites

The following sites in Canadian County are listed on the National Register of Historic Places:

References

Further reading

External links

 Canadian County Government website
 Encyclopedia of Oklahoma History and Culture - Canadian County
 Oklahoma Digital Maps: Digital Collections of Oklahoma and Indian Territory
 Mogg, Joe L., Stuart L. Schoff and E. W. Reed. Ground Water Resources of Canadian County, Oklahoma.  Oklahoma Geological Society Bulletin No. 87. 1960. Accessed June 20, 2016.

 
Oklahoma City metropolitan area
1890 establishments in Oklahoma Territory
Populated places established in 1890